Ptilocnemus is a genus of feather-legged bugs in the Holoptilinae subfamily. At least 12 species have been described. These species have a specialized gland called a trichome that produces a chemical to attract and paralyze ants.

Partial species list
Ptilocnemus borealis Malipatil, 1985
Ptilocnemus femoralis Horváth, 1902
Ptilocnemus lemur (Westwood. 1840)

References

Reduviidae